Walter Stanley Wilde (27 February 1908 – 21 August 1968) played first-class cricket for Somerset in seven County Championship matches in the 1929 season. He was born in Long Ashton, Somerset and died at Clevedon, Somerset.

Wilde was a tail-end batsman and a wicketkeeper who was drafted into the Somerset side for early matches in May and June 1929 because of the illness of the regular wicketkeeper Wally Luckes. Wisden Cricketers' Almanack noted that Somerset used seven different wicketkeepers during the 1929 season, including Wilde and Luckes.

Wilde's only batting success and the only time he reached double figures in first-class cricket came in the match against Derbyshire at Burton-on-Trent when he made 21 of a last-wicket partnership of 47 with Michael Bennett which still did not manage to prevent Somerset from being forced to follow on. In this game he took three catches off the bowling of Arthur Wellard in Derbyshire's only innings, the best return of his short career. When the amateur Michael Spurway became available to keep wicket in mid-season, Wilde, as a professional, was dropped and did not play first-class cricket again.

References

1908 births
1968 deaths
English cricketers
Somerset cricketers
Cricketers from Somerset